The Constituent Assembly was the Portuguese constituent assembly elected on 25 April 1975, after the Carnation Revolution (25 April 1974), for the purpose of adopting a constitution for the Third Portuguese Republic, the Constitution of 1976.

Background 
After the Carnation Revolution, the National Salvation Junta dissolved all political offices previously existing in the Estado Novo (Law no. 1/74). On 14 May 1974, the President of the National Salvation Junta, António de Spínola, abolished the National Assembly and the Corporative Chamber (Law no. 2/74), the two parliamentary chambers in the Estado Novo, and established a transitory constitution (Law no. 3/74) to be used until the new constitution was approved.

Elections 

The election of the Constituent Assembly was carried out in Portugal on 25 April 1975, exactly one year after the Carnation Revolution and was the first free election in fifty years, the first in the new democratic regime created after the revolution.

The election was won by the Socialist Party, with the Democratic Party being the second most voted party. The parliament had a large majority of parties defending socialist or democratic socialist ideas and the Constitution, approved on 2 April 1976, reflected such influence.

See also 
 Constitution of Portugal
 History of Portugal
 São Bento Palace

References 

1975 establishments in Portugal
1976 disestablishments in Portugal
Political history of Portugal
1970s in Portugal
Portugal